Entre Nous ("Between Us"; also known as Coup de foudre) is a 1983 French biographical drama film directed by Diane Kurys, who shares the writing credits with Olivier Cohen. Set in the France of the mid 20th century, the film stars Isabelle Huppert, Miou-Miou, Guy Marchand, Jean-Pierre Bacri, Christine Pascal, Denis Lavant and Dominique Lavanant. Coup de Foudre means "love at first sight".

Plot
In France in 1942 a young Jewish woman, Léna, is interned by the Vichy authorities and risks deportation to Nazi Germany. Michel, one of the guards, offers to save her by marrying her. They escape on foot over the Alps to Italy. After the war they settle in Lyon, where Michel opens a garage and Léna has two daughters with him. At a school event she meets another mother, Madeleine, married with one son. The two women become close friends and the two  husbands get along with each other, though both men are secretly jealous of the bond their wives share.

Madeleine has a brief affair with her former art teacher, for which Léna lends her flat. Unfortunately, Michel comes home at lunchtime and finds the guilty couple. This turns him against Madeleine, and Léna's friendship with her. The two women were planning to open a dress shop, which Michel says he will finance provided it is without Madeleine, who has gone off to Paris. Taking a night train to go and see her, Léna has a sexual encounter with a soldier, her first experience apart from Michel and very enjoyable. In Paris, the two women dance and get drunk in a night club and fall into bed together.

But Léna has not realised the fragility of Madeleine, who is placed in a mental hospital and then released to the care of her parents. Going to see her, Léna takes her out to show her the new dress shop. Unfortunately, Michel drops in and on seeing Madeleine there smashes the place up. Léna takes Madeleine and their children away to a rented house beside the sea, where Michel turns up trying for reconciliation. An end caption says that Madeleine died.

Cast
 Miou-Miou as Madeleine Segara née Vernier
 Isabelle Huppert as Lena Korski née Weber
 Guy Marchand as Michel Korski
 Jean-Pierre Bacri as Costa Segara
 Robin Renucci as Raymond
 Patrick Bauchau as Roland Carlier
 Jacques Alric as Mr. Vernier
 Jacqueline Doyen as Mme. Vernier
 Saga Blanchard as Sophie
 Guillaume Le Guellec as René Segara
 Christine Pascal as Sarah
 Corinne Anxionnaz as 'unnamed'	
 Jacques Blal as Lionel Feldman
 Bernard Cazassus as Le chef de gare
 Gérard Chambre as Flirt

Awards and nominations

Won
 San Sebastián Film Festival
 FIPRESCI Prize (Diane Kurys)

Nominated
 Academy Awards
 Best Foreign Language Film
 César Awards
 Best Actor – Supporting Role (Guy Marchand) 
 Best Actress – Leading Role (Miou-Miou) 
 Best Film
 Best Screenplay – Original (Diane Kurys and Alain Le Henry)

See also
 Isabelle Huppert on screen and stage
 List of submissions to the 56th Academy Awards for Best Foreign Language Film
 List of French submissions for the Academy Award for Best Foreign Language Film

References

External links
 
 
 
 

1983 films
1980s biographical drama films
French biographical drama films
Films directed by Diane Kurys
Films set in the 1940s
Films set in the 1950s
1980s French-language films
Gaumont Film Company films
1983 drama films
1980s French films